Melong is a community in Cameroon.  It lies on the N5 road to the north of Nkongsamba. The soil is volcanic and fertile. The country around Melong was once covered by thick rainforest, the native population are Mbo'o, a group of Sawa people who are established in the Littoral and South West Region of the Country. The community is made up of many villages like Melong Center, Mouanguel, Mbouroukou, Mboussoum, Mankwa, and Nsanke. Melong is a volcanic area and very favorable for agriculture. From here it is possible to visit the twin Manengouba lakes, and waterfalls from Ekom on the River Nkam.

Gallery

See also
Communes of Cameroon

References

Sources

Populated places in Littoral Region (Cameroon)